The Amtrak Hudson Line, also known as the CSX Hudson Subdivision, is a railroad line owned by CSX Transportation and leased by Amtrak in the U.S. state of New York.  The line runs from Poughkeepsie north along the east shore of the Hudson River to Rensselaer and northwest to Hoffmans via Albany and Schenectady along a former New York Central Railroad line. From its south end, CSX has trackage rights south to New York City along the Metro-North Railroad's Hudson Line. The Hudson Line junctions the Castleton Subdivision in Stuyvesant, Amtrak's Post Road Branch in Rensselaer and the Carman Subdivision in Schenectady. Its northwest end is at a merge with the Mohawk Subdivision.

The entirety of the line overlaps with the Empire Corridor, one of Amtrak and the Federal Railroad Administration's candidate lines for future high-speed rail.

History
The Mohawk and Hudson Railroad opened a line from Albany to Schenectady in 1831. The Utica and Schenectady Railroad opened from Schenectady west to Utica in 1836, including the present Hudson Subdivision west of Schenectady. On the east side of the Hudson River, the Hudson River Railroad opened from New York City north to Rensselaer in 1851. The original Hudson River crossing was the Hudson River Bridge, but the Livingston Avenue Bridge, the current crossing, opened in 1902. The entire line became part of the New York Central, later Penn Central, and finally Conrail, through leases, mergers, and takeovers. The line was then assigned to CSX in the 1999 breakup of Conrail.

In October 2011, CSX and Amtrak reached an agreement for Amtrak to lease the line between Poughkeepsie and Schenectady, with Amtrak assuming maintenance and capital responsibilities. CSX will retain freight rights over the line, which hosts two freights a day. Amtrak has used federal funds to double-track the line between Rensselaer and Schenectady and add an additional station track at the Albany-Rensselaer station. Amtrak sees the lease as a key to improving Empire Service speeds and frequencies. Amtrak officially assumed control on December 1, 2012, with trains in the section now dispatched by the Amtrak Control and Command Center in New York City.

Services

Current service
As a segment of the Empire Corridor, the Hudson Line carries five Amtrak routes. The Empire Service, Lake Shore Limited and Maple Leaf operate over the entire Hudson Line, while the Adirondack and Ethan Allen Express use the line southeast of the Delaware and Hudson Railway junction in Schenectady. The trackage west of that junction to Hoffmans is owned by Amtrak and used by CSX via trackage rights.

The Hudson Line has four stations: Schenectady Intermodal Station, Albany–Rensselaer station, Hudson station, and Rhinecliff–Kingston station. Schenectady and Rensselaer are served by all five Amtrak services, while Hudson and Rhinecliff are bypassed only by the Lake Shore Limited.

Former service
Service on the line was originally established as the Hudson River Railroad in 1846, opened to Rensselaer in 1851, and later became part of the New York Central Railroad. Following New York Central's 1968 merger  and the  PC 1970 bankruptcy, Conrail assumed responsibility for  the line. Conrail abandoned all non-Amtrak stations in 1981, and when the Metro-North Railroad was established in 1983 to take over operations of what became the Hudson Line, service did not resume.

Stations
HD refers to the Hudson Division, the New York Central (and later Conrail) line that preceded to Metro-North's Hudson Line.

See also
 List of CSX Transportation lines

References

CSX Transportation lines
Rail infrastructure in New York (state)
New York Central Railroad lines
Subdivisions of the New York Central Railroad